The Futsal Mundialito is an international futsal competition of the same kind of the FIFA Futsal World Cup but with invited nations similar to the Grand Prix de Futsal. It was first held in 1994.

Results

Medal count

Participating nations
Legend
 — Champions
 — Runners-up
 — Third place
 — Fourth place
5th-8th — Fifth to Eighth place
R1 — Round 1
q — Qualified for upcoming tournament
 — Hosts

General Statistics
As 2008

Table as of July 2008. Source:

References

External links
 Futsal Mundialito Overview

 
International futsal competitions